Tlahuiltepa is a town and one of the 84 municipalities of Hidalgo, in central-eastern Mexico.  The municipality covers an area of 467.7 km².

As of 2005, the municipality had a total population of 9,264.

References

Municipalities of Hidalgo (state)
Populated places in Hidalgo (state)